Tŷ Hywel (Hywel House or Hywel's House) is a building in Cardiff, Wales, used by the Senedd (Welsh Parliament; ; formerly the National Assembly for Wales). It is named after the medieval king  (Howell the Good), King of Deheubarth in South West Wales. The building was previously known as Crickhowell House, after the former Secretary of State for Wales, Lord Crickhowell. It houses Members of the Senedd and their staff, as well as staff of the Senedd Commission. The Welsh Government also operates from the building and occupies one whole floor and part of another.  It is leased by the Senedd under the Government of Wales Act 1998.

It is built of red brick and is connected to the Senedd debating chamber in Cardiff Bay. Tŷ Hywel houses staff of the Senedd Commission, MSes, the First Minister and other ministers.

Tŷ Hywel is part of the Senedd estate in Cardiff Bay, along with the Senedd building and the Grade 1 listed Pierhead Building. Two covered link bridges connect the Senedd building to Tŷ Hywel. Construction of the link bridges began in September 2004 and they were completed by December 2005.

Notes

External links
 

Politics of Cardiff
Buildings and structures in Cardiff
Government buildings in Wales
Senedd buildings
Government buildings completed in 1993